Giza Studio R&B Respect Vol.1: Six Sisters Selection is a cover compilation album produced by Daiko Nagato. It was released on 5 December 2001 under the Giza Studio label.

Background
The album features six R&B cover songs which are covered by six young artist at that time from Giza Studio album. The official website includes liner notes and comments from each artist.

On 15 December 2001, all six singers performed cover songs in live house Ohsaka Hill Pankoujou. The live footage has been released in DVD Giza Studio R&B Party at the “Hills Pan Koujou on 14 February 2002.

Some fans were dissatisfied because of low track list numbers and wished each artist recorded two cover tracks.

Chart performance
The album debuted at number 20 on the Oricon Weekly Albums Chart.

Track listing

Personnel
Credits adapted from album booklet.
Satoru Kobayashi - arrange (1)
Perry Geyer - arrange (2)
DJ-MEYA & Dr.Terachi - arrange (3)
Hirohito Furui (Garnet Crow) - arrange (4)
Akihito Tokunaga - arrange (5)
Midori Miwa - arrange (6)
Kazunobu Mashima - backing vocals (1)
Erica Haupt - keyboard (2)
Jeffrey Qwest - backing vocals (2,4,5)
Ryoichi Terashima - electric guitar (3)
Fusanosuke Kondou - backing vocals (3)
David C.Brown - backing vocals (3)
Maho Furukawa (4D-JAM) - backing vocals (4)
Makoto Miyoshi (Rumania Montevideo) - guitar (5,6)
Satin Doll - backing vocals (5)
Keiko Utoku - backing vocals (6)
Terukado - backing vocals (6)

References

Being Inc. albums
Covers albums
2001 albums